The Ulster Senior League is a rugby union competition for senior clubs in the Irish province of Ulster. It was formed by the then Northern Branch of the Irish Rugby Football Union in October 1890. It has traditionally being ranked second in importance to the Ulster Senior Cup. It has declined in importance due to the formation of the All-Ireland League and growth in importance of the Heineken Cup.

The Senior League has had a chequered history. Its value was marred in the amateur era by periods when the elite clubs like North, Instonians and Collegians withdrew from the league to allow them to fulfil more friendly fixtures - particularly against English and Welsh opposition. This attitude from some of the senior clubs even lead to the scrapping of the league in 1930, and it was not re-established until after World War II. The practice of withdrawing from the league finally died out in the 1970s.

Mostly the league was played in one section on an all-play-all home and away basis. However, with the expansion of the number of Senior Clubs in 1980, two sections were formed and the top two teams qualified for semi-finals. This allowed for a showpiece final at the end of the season.

The two section arrangement continued until 1990 when the advent of professionalism and preparation for the All-Ireland League, saw the league separated into two sections based on playing ability. Promotion and relegation between the two sections was introduced at this time. This later gave way to a single-division league.

From the 2015–16 season, the League was renamed as the Ulster Championship League and divided into two sections (Division 1 and Division 2), with promotion and relegation between the two. The league was renamed the Soni Premiership in 2016–17.

The winners receive the Stevenson Shield.

Membership 2019-20

Division 1
Ballymena
Ballynahinch
Banbridge
Malone
Queen's University
Rainey Old Boys

Division 2
Armagh
Bangor
Belfast Harlequins
City of Derry
Dungannon
Omagh

Winners

1890s
 1890/91 Queen's College Belfast
 1891/92 NIFC
 1892/93 NIFC
 1893/94 NIFC
 1894/95 NIFC
 1895/96 NIFC
 1896/97 NIFC
 1897/98 NIFC
 1898/99 NIFC

1900s
 1899/1900 Queen's College Belfast
 1900/01 NIFC 
 1901/02 NIFC
 1902/03 Collegians
 1903/04 Malone 
 1904/05 Malone
 1905/06 Malone
 1906/07 Malone
 1907/08 Collegians
 1908/09 NIFC

1910s
 1909/10
 1910/11 Collegians
 1911/12 Queen's University
 1912/13 Collegians
 1913/14 Season abandoned due political crisis caused by the Home Rule Crisis.
 1914/15-1918/19 Not played due to World War I

1920s
 1919/20 Queen's University
 1920/21 NIFC
 1921/22 Queen's University
 1922/23 Queen's University
 1923/24 Queen's University
 1924/25 Instonians
 1925/26 Instonians
 1926/27 Instonians/NIFC
 1927/28 Instonians
 1928/29 Civil Service

1930s
 1929/30 Bangor
 1930/31-1944/45 Not played

1940s
 1945/46 NIFC
 1946/47 Queen's University
 1947/48 Queen's University
 1948/49 Queen's University

1950s
 1949/50 Queen's University
 1950/51 Collegians/Instonians
 1951/52 Collegians
 1952/53 Instonians/Queen's University
 1953/54 Instonians/Queen's University
 1954/55 NIFC
 1955/56 Collegians
 1956/57 Instonians/Queen's University
 1957/58 Instonians
 1958/59 NIFC

1960s
 1959/60 Instonians
 1960/61 Dungannon
 1961/62 Collegians
 1962/63 C.I.Y.M.S.
 1963/64 Queen's University
 1964/65 Dungannon
 1965/66 NIFC
 1966/67 Queen's University
 1967/68 Dungannon
 1968/69 Malone

1970s
 1969/70 Civil Service
 1970/71 C.I.Y.M.S.
 1971/72 C.I.Y.M.S.
 1972/73 Ballymena/C.I.Y.M.S.
 1973/74 C.I.Y.M.S.
 1974/75 Bangor
 1975/76 Ballymena
 1976/77 Bangor
 1977/78 Ballymena
 1978/79 Ballymena

1980s
 1979/80 Queen's University
 1980/81 Bangor 
 1981/82 Bangor 
 1982/83 Bangor 
 1983/84 Ards 
 1984/85 Instonians 
 1985/86 Ballymena 
 1986/87 Instonians 
 1987/88 Bangor 
 1988/89 Ballymena

1990s
 1989/90 Ballymena 
 1990/91 Dungannon 
 1991/92 NIFC 
 1992/93 Malone 
 1993/94
 1994/95
 1995/96 Portadown 
 1996/97 Ballymena
 1997/98 Ballymena
 1998/99

2000s
 1999/2000 City of Derry
 2000/01 Ballymena
 2001/02 Ballymena
 2002/03 Belfast Harlequins
 2003/04 Belfast Harlequins
 2004/05 Ballymena/Belfast Harlequins
 2005/06 Ballymena/Dungannon
 2006/07 Belfast Harlequins
 2007/08 Belfast Harlequins
 2008/09 Ballynahinch

2010s
 2009/10 
 2010/11
 2011/12
 2012/13 Ballynahinch
 2013-14 Ballynahinch
 2014-15 Ballynahinch
 2015-16 Ballymena
 2016-17 Armagh
 2017-18 Armagh
 2018-19 Ballynahinch

2020s
 2019/20 Rainey Old Boys
 2020/21 Not played due to COVID-19 pandemic
 2021/22 Ballynahinch
 2022/23 Ballynahinch

See also
 Connacht Senior League
 Leinster Senior League
 Munster Senior League

Sources

3
Rugby union competitions in Ulster
Irish senior rugby competitions